The links below contain all of the 8579 railway stations in Japan.

External links

 

Railway stations
Japan